Minimum is a numerical concept.

Minimum (Latin  for least or smallest) may also refer to:

 Minimum, Missouri,  community in the United States

See also 
 Minima naturalia, in Aristotelian physics
 Mini mum, species of microhylid frog endemic to Madagascar